FabricLive.17 was the second DJ mix album mixed by Aim. It forms part of the FabricLive Mix Series by different DJs, recorded for Fabric, a nightclub and record label in London, UK. The album was released in August 2004 on the Fabric (London) label.

Track listing

  Tony D - Come Back To You - Grand Central
  Boards Of Canada - Roygbiv - Warp
  James Yorkston and the Athletes - St. Patrick - Domino
  InI - What You Say - Rapstar
  Scott Lark - Insight - Contract Recordings
  Lewis Parker - 101 Pianos (I've Put Out The Lights) - Virgin
  Boogiemonsters - Strange - EMI
  Lords of the Underground - Faith (Alternate TV track) - Pendulum
  Bloik - Loungin' - Mint Source
  Tom Scott - Today - UMG
  A Tribe Called Quest - Award Tour - Zomba
  Ed O.G. & Da Bulldogs - Love Comes and Goes - UMG
  Diverse - Jus Biz - Chocolate Industries
  Telegraph Avenue - Something Going - Lazarus Audio Products
  Tempo 70 - Ell Galleton - Mericana/Salsoul 
  The Village Callers - I Don't Need No Doctor - Rampart
  Ice Cube - It Was A Good Day (Radio Mix) - Priority
  The Byrds - Wasn't Born To Follow - Sony 
  Fingathing - Lady Nebula - Grand Central

References

External links
Fabric: FabricLive.17

Aim (musician) albums
2004 compilation albums